105 mm (4.1 in) is a NATO-standard artillery and tank gun calibre. The rifled tank round is defined by STANAG 4458. The artillery round is defined by AOP-29 part 3 with reference to STANAG 4425.

Artillery
Since the early 21st century, most NATO armies have settled on the larger 155 mm as their standard artillery calibre, as it is a good compromise between range and power, and using a single calibre simplifies logistics. However, some military forces have retained 105 mm towed howitzers for their lighter weight and greater portability, including their rapid airlift and airdrop capabilities. The lesser power and shorter range of 105 mm ammunition has led to its obsolescence in full-sized self-propelled guns such as the American M108 howitzer and British FV433 Abbot. Russian guns and those of former Soviet bloc countries tend to use slightly larger, 122 mm (4.8 in) and 
130 mm (5.1 in) weapons in similar roles.

Guns
FV433 Abbot
G7 howitzer
GIAT LG1
Indian field gun 
KH178 105 mm towed howitzer
L118 light gun/M119 howitzer (United Kingdom)
M-56 howitzer
M101 howitzer
M102 howitzer (United States)
M108 howitzer (United States)
Mk 61 105 mm self-propelled howitzer (France)
OTO Melara Mod 56
Type 74 105 mm self-propelled howitzer

Tank guns
During the Cold War, the concept of the main battle tank was established and guns of 105 mm (NATO) and 100 mm (Warsaw Pact) were the standard until the advent of guns of 120 mm (NATO) and 125 mm (Warsaw Pact) from the 1960s to the 1990s. The Royal Ordnance L7 was widely used by NATO countries, and with it was popularized the now-standard 105×617mmR round, still used both in lighter-weight applications such as the Stingray light tank and the Stryker Mobile Gun System as well as older main battle tanks.

Guns
CN 105 F1 (France)
CN 105-57 (France)
Cockerill 105 HP Gun 
Royal Ordnance L7 (United Kingdom)
M68 (United States)
M35 (United States)

References

Artillery
Ammunition